Fingrid Oyj is a Finnish national electricity transmission grid operator. It is owned by the Finnish state (53.1 %) and various financial and insurance institutions (46.9 %). CEO of the company is Jukka Ruusunen. 

In 2011, power companies Fortum Power and Heat Oy and Pohjolan Voima sold their stakes in Fingrid (25% each), because of EU Internal Market Directive in Electricity, which requires that power production and ownership of the transmission systems should be separate. The transmission from and to the Russian network was interrupted by the Russian side on May 13, 2022.

See also

Energy in Finland
European Network of Transmission System Operators for Electricity (ENTSO-E)

References

External links
 

Companies based in Helsinki
Electric power transmission system operators in Finland
Energy companies established in 1996